Kandarathitham is a village in the Ariyalur taluk of Ariyalur district, Tamil Nadu, India.

Demographics 

 census, Kandarathitham had a total population of 3798 with 1807 males and 1991 females. It is famous for its antique temples.

References 

Villages in Ariyalur district